The Psychedelic World of the 13th Floor Elevators is a 3 disc box set. The set collects the band's studio output, with live cuts, alternate versions, and the two original singles as The Spades.

Track listing

CD 1

 You're Gonna Miss Me
 Roller Coaster
 Splash 1
 Reverbation (Doubt)
 Don't Fall Down
 Fire Engine
 Thru the Rhythm
 You Don't Know
 Kingdom of Heaven
 Monkey Island
 Tried to Hide
 Everybody Needs Somebody to Love
 Before You Accuse Me
 You Don't Know
 I'm Gonna Love You Too
 You Really Got Me
 Splash 1
 Fire Engine
 Roll Over Beethoven
 The Word
 Monkey Island
 Roller Coaster

Tracks 1–11 are The Psychedelic Sounds of the 13th Floor Elevators. Tracks 12–22 were recorded live in San Francisco, 1966.

CD 2

 Slip Inside This House
 Slide Machine
 She Lives (In a Time of Her Own)
 Nobody to Love
 Baby Blue
 Earthquake
 Dust
 Levitation
 I Had to Tell You
 Pictures (Leave Your Body Behind)
 Splash 1
 Kingdom of Heaven
 You're Gonna Miss Me
 She Lives (In a Time of Her Own)
 Reverbation
 You're Gonna Miss Me
 We Sell Soul
 Fire in My Bones
 Levitation Blues (Instrumental)
 Slip Inside This House (Single Edited Version)

Tracks 1–10 were released in 1967 as Easter Everywhere. Track 10 was listed as "Postures (Leave Your Body Behind)" on Easter Everywhere. Tracks 11–15 were recorded live in Texas, 1967 and released ten years later. Tracks 16 and 17 are 1965-released single sides by The Spades. Track 18 was unreleased until 1991's "Unreleased Masters" compilation was made available. Track 19 appeared on the expanded version of Easter Everywhere titled "Levitation (Instrumental)".

CD 3

 Before You Accuse Me
 She Lives in a Time of Her Own
 Tried to Hide
 You Gotta Take That Girl
 I'm Gonna Love You Too
 Everybody Needs Somebody to Love
 I've Got Levitation
 You Can't Hurt Me Anymore
 Roller Coaster
 You're Gonna Miss Me
 Livin' On
 Barnyard Blues
 Till Then
 Never Another
 Rose and the Thorn
 Down by the River
 Scarlet and Gold
 Street Song
 Doctor Doom
 With You
 May the Circle Remain Unbroken
 Wait for My Love
 Splash
 Right Track Now
 Radio Spot for Bull of the Woods Album.

Tracks 1–10 are from the album Live. Tracks 11–21 are from the album Bull of the Woods. Tracks 23 and 24 are by Roky Erickson & Clementine Hall.

See also
The Psychedelic Sounds of the 13th Floor Elevators
Easter Everywhere
Red Krayola

The 13th Floor Elevators albums
2002 compilation albums
Acid rock compilation albums